The 2008 Australian Carrera Cup Championship was a CAMS sanctioned motor racing title for drivers of Porsche 911 GT3 Cup Cars. The championship, which was contested over nine rounds across five different states, began on 21 February 2008 at the Clipsal 500 and finished on 26 October at the Gold Coast Indy 300. It was the sixth and last Australian Carrera Cup Championship until the 2011 season.

Craig Baird dominated the series, winning 14 of the series 25 races and the New Zealander driving for Fitzgerald Racing became the first driver to win the series twice, adding to his 2006 championship win. West Australian Dean Fiore was the runner up for Sonic Motor Racing, taking four wins and dominating the Mount Panorama round. Third was David Russell in the Sherrin Motor Sport car.

The most dramatic moment of the season was when category managers Sherrin Motor Sport collapsed, leaving the series briefly in limbo.  With the assistance of CAMS and Porsche Australia, Glenn Ridge owned company Q Media Events took over the running of the series.

Teams and drivers
The following teams and drivers have competed in the Championship.

 Guest drivers ineligible for points.

Race calendar

Each of the nine rounds was contested over three races.

Points system
Championship points were awarded on 60–54–48–42–36–30–27–24–21–18–15–12–9–6–6–3–3–3–3–3 basis to the first twenty finishers in each race with 1 point awarded to each driver finishing in positions from 21st through to last.

Results and standings

Drivers' championship

See also
 Australian Carrera Cup Championship
 Porsche Supercup
 Porsche 911 GT3
 Porsche 997

References

Further reading
 Double Cup Trouble, The Annual – Australian Motorsport, Number 4/2008, pages 66–73

External links
 Official Australian Carrera Cup website As captured by web.archive.org on 18 July 2008
 2008 Racing Results Archive

Australian Carrera Cup Championship seasons
Carrera Cup Championship